Alberto Carneroli (22 February 1943 - 25 July 2016) was an Italian sport shooter who won medals at senior level at the World Championships and European Championships.

Honours
 CONI: Golden Collar of Sports Merit: Collare d'Oro al Merito Sportivo

See also
Trap World Champions

References

External links
 

1943 births
2016 deaths
Trap and double trap shooters
Italian male sport shooters
People from Urbino
Sportspeople from the Province of Pesaro and Urbino